Peter Doohan was the defending champion.

Eddie Edwards won the title, defeating Doohan 6–2, 6–4 in the final.

Seeds

 n/a
  John Fitzgerald (quarterfinals)
  Jonathan Canter (first round)
  Amos Mansdorf (quarterfinals)
  Jeremy Bates (first round)
  Jonas Svensson (first round)
  Kelly Evernden (first round)
  Peter Doohan (final)

Draw

Finals

Top half

Bottom half

External links
 1985 South Australian Open draw

Singles